Ali Mohamad Suheimat Eng. (born 1936) المهندس علي محمد السحيمات, is a Jordanian politician and engineer, who held several senior political and administrative positions in the Hashemite Kingdom of Jordan. Ali Suheimat was born in the city of Al-Karak. He was deputy prime minister, mayor of Amman, Minister of Transport and Communications, amongst other positions.
Board member of trustees at Oxford Centre for Islamic studies.

Education 

Received his primary, lower secondary and secondary education at Al-Karak Secondary School.
Bachelor's degree in Civil Engineering in 1960, American University of Beirut, Lebanon.
Diploma in the Establishment and maintenance of roads in 1963, the United States of America.
Diploma in development planning for development projects and economies in developing countries, University of Sussex, UK in 1969.

Career 

 Engineer in the Ministry of Public Works, during the period from 1960 to 1962 in the Directorate of Works, in Ma'an, Al-Karak and Irbid.
 Road maintenance engineer at the Ministry of Public Works, during 1963–1964.
 Director of projects and road construction at the largest companies in Saudi Arabia for the construction engineering specialists in the construction of the roads and airports in 1964–1968.
 Responsible for follow-up development projects and understated road projects, airports and infrastructure from 1969–1971, at The National Planning Council in Jordan.
 Secretary General of the Ministry of Transport 1/2/1971 to 1/3/1973 .
 Minister of Transport,  the Government of Mudar Badran, in the period from 28/11/1976 to 19/12/1979, where he oversaw the completion of the Queen Alia International Airport and the port of Aqaba, and a number of vital projects, which has contributed to the development of Jordan.
 Minister of State for Cabinet Affairs and Minister of Transport, the government of Sharif Abdul Hamid Sharaf from 19/09/1979 to 07/03/1980.
 Minister of State for Cabinet Affairs and Minister of Transport, the Government of Kassim al-Rimawi 03/07/1980 to 28/08/1980.
 Minister of State for Cabinet Affairs and Minister of Transport, the Government of Mudar Badran from 28/08/1980 to 01/10/1984.
 Mayor of Amman, (1989–1991).
 Member of the Royal Commission for the drafting of the Second National Charter in 1990.
 Deputy Prime Minister and Minister of Transport and Communications,  the Government of Taher al-Masri from 19/06/1991 to 21/11/1991.
 Deputy Prime Minister and Minister of Transport, the Government of Sharif Zaid ibn Shaker  21/11/1991 to 29/05/1993.
 Member of the first Advisory Council from 1978 to 20/04/1980.
 Member of the Advisory Council II 20/04/1980 to 20/04/1982.
 Member of the third Advisory Board  20/04/1982 to 07/01/1984 .
 Chairman of the Board of Trustees of the Petra University, Amman-Jordan .
 Member of the Royal Commission of the University of Yarmouk, which oversaw the establishment and the building of Yarmouk University and Jordan University of Science and Technology. 1977–1986.
 Member of the Royal Commission on Mu'tah University. 1981–1996.
 Member of the Board of University of Mu'tah.
 Member of the Board in a number of companies and Institutions.
 Consultant to many companies and global institutions outside Jordan.

References

External links
 Prime Ministry of Jordan website

Mayors of places in Jordan
Government ministers of Jordan
Transport ministers of Jordan
Prime ministry affairs ministers of Jordan
Communications ministers of Jordan
Deputy prime ministers of Jordan
Living people
1936 births
American University of Beirut alumni
Alumni of the University of Sussex
Academic staff of Petra University
Academic staff of Yarmouk University
Mayors of Amman